The women's field hockey tournament at the 2013 East Asian Games was the third and final edition of the field hockey tournament at the East Asian Games. The tournament took place over a six-day period, beginning on 6 October, culminating with medal finals on 12 October. All games were played at the Tianjin Olympic Center in Tianjin, China.

Japan won the tournament, defeating China 4–3 in the final. Chinese Taipei finished in third place after defeating Hong Kong 4–2 in the third place playoff.

Competition format
The four nations competed in a single round-robin format to determine group standings. At the conclusion of the group matches, the top two teams competed in the gold-medal match, while the teams placed third and fourth played off for bronze.

Teams
The following teams participated in the tournament:

Head coach: Weng Haiqin

Head coach: Lin Min-Nan

Head coach:  Tina Bell-Kake

Head coach:  Yu Seung-Jin

Officials
The following umpires were appointed by the Asian Hockey Federation and the FIH to officiate the tournament:

 Nur Hafizah Azman (MAS)
 Ikumi Negishi (JPN)
 Melanie Oakden (NZL)
 Tang Shi-Him (HKG)
 Kamolrat Thongkanarak (THA)
 Tian Yimiao (CHN)

Results
All times are local (UTC+08:00).

Group stage

Fixtures

Classification matches

Bronze-medal match

Gold-medal match

Statistics

Final standings

Goalscorers

References

External links
 Official Site

Women's tournament
East Asian Games
2013 East Asian Games